Róbert Söptei (27 August 1926 – 11 November 2016) was a Hungarian sprint canoeist who competed in the early 1950s. He finished seventh in the C-2 10000 m event at the 1952 Summer Olympics in Helsinki.

References
Róbert Söptei's profile at Sports Reference.com
Róbert Söptei's obituary

1926 births
2016 deaths
Canoeists at the 1952 Summer Olympics
Hungarian male canoeists
Olympic canoeists of Hungary
20th-century Hungarian people